This is a list of the extant and extinct (†) species in the ant genus Monomorium

A-D

E-H

I-L

M-N

O-S

T-Z

References

Encyclopedia of Life entry

Monomorium